Ross Thompson may refer to:
 Ross Thompson (boxer)
 Ross Thompson (rugby union)
 Ross Thompson (professor)

See also
 Ross Thomson, Scottish politician